A declaration of war is a formal act by which one nation goes to war against another.

Declaration of war may also refer to:

"Declaration of War" (song), a song by Hadouken
Declaration of War (film), a French film
Declaration of War (horse), a racehorse
Declaration of War (album), by Rahowa